Jiří Ondráček (born June 3, 1988) is a Czech professional ice hockey player. He played with HC Zlín in the Czech Extraliga during the 2010–11 Czech Extraliga season.

References

External links

1988 births
Czech ice hockey forwards
PSG Berani Zlín players
Living people
People from Havířov
Sportspeople from the Moravian-Silesian Region